A heavy brigade is a formation made up from 'Heavy' Cavalry; i.e. Dragoon Guards and Dragoons.

The Heavy Brigade was a British heavy cavalry unit commanded by General Sir James York Scarlett at the Battle of Balaclava in the Crimean War. The Brigade made a gallant uphill charge to defeat a superior force of onrushing Russian cavalry, an amazing instance of the triumph of the individual skill of the Victorian British soldier, as well as of British discipline and unit cohesion.

At the Battle of Balaclava the brigade was composed of 2 squadrons each of the 1st Dragoons (The Royals), the 2nd Dragoons (Scots Greys), the 4th Dragoon Guards (Royal Irish), the 5th Dragoon Guards (Princess Charlotte of Wales's), and the 6th Dragoons (Inniskilling).

See also
Heavy Brigade Combat Team

References

British military units and formations of the Crimean War